Volume 3: Set Co-ordinates for the White Dwarf!!! is the third extended play (EP) by American desert rock collective The Desert Sessions. Recorded in February 1995 and August and September 1997 at Rancho De La Luna, it was released by Man's Ruin Records on May 12, 1998. The album features eight credited musicians, including Josh Homme, Peter Stahl and Ben Shepherd. It was later re-released with Volume 4: Hard Walls and Little Trips as Volumes 3 & 4.

Recording and release
The third Desert Sessions EP features songs recorded at Rancho De La Luna in Joshua Tree, California, a studio founded by Fred Drake and Dave Catching, at three different sessions: one by the band earthlings? in February 1995 ("Sugar Rush"), one by The Desert Sessions between August 8 and 12, 1997 ("Nova" and "Avon") and another by earthlings? in September 1997 ("At the Helm of Hell's Ships"). The album features a total of eight credited musicians: Josh Homme, Peter Stahl (both guitars and vocals), John McBain (guitars), Ben Shepherd (bass), Alfredo Hernández (drums), Catching (guitar and bass), Drake (drums and bass) and Musharitas (vocals). The Desert Sessions tracks were mixed by Homme and the earthlings? tracks were mixed by Drake, with Musharitas co-mixing "Sugar Rush".

Volume 3 was initially released alone on vinyl by Man's Ruin Records on May 12, 1998. It later received a re-release with its follow-up, Volume 4: Hard Walls and Little Trips, on CD on October 27, 1998 as Volumes 3 & 4.

Critical reception

Music website AllMusic awarded Volume 3: Set Co-ordinates for the White Dwarf!!! three and a half out of five stars. Writer Ned Raggett said the following in his review of the album: "Peter Stahl ... [adds] some almost good-time aggro to the sludgy crunch of the opening "Nova" as Josh Homme's guitar moodily spaces out in the middle distance. "At the Helm of Hells Ships" allows Stahl to indulge in a bit of beatnik spoken word weirdness over some muddy space rock action; it works better than it sounds. Homme himself steps to the fore vocally with "Avon," a chugging blast of feedback that would make Hawkwind proud, while the whole thing wraps up with "Sugar Rush," a steady-as-she-goes instrumental with sci-fi B-movie dialogue samples and the like. About the only thing missing is the dry heat and weed."

Track listing

Personnel
Personnel credits adapted from album liner notes.

Josh Homme – guitars , vocals , mixing 
Peter Stahl – vocals , guitar 
John McBain – guitars 
Ben Shepherd – bass 
Alfredo Hernández – drums 
Dave Catching – guitar , bass 
Fred Drake – drums , bass , mixing 
Musharitas – vocals and mixing

References

1998 EPs
The Desert Sessions albums
Man's Ruin Records EPs